Donna M. Soucy (born September 7, 1967) is an American attorney and Democratic member of the New Hampshire Senate, first elected in 2012 in the 18th district. She is previously served as the President of the New Hampshire Senate, from December 5, 2018 until December 2, 2020. Soucy serves on the Senate Commerce, and Rules and Enrolled Bills committees, in addition to the Joint Fiscal Committee Soucy has also previously served in the New Hampshire House of Representatives and as a Manchester alderman.

Early life and education
Soucy's mother was Lillian Soucy, a New Hampshire state representative who died in 1990, the year after she graduated from Saint Anselm College in Goffstown, New Hampshire. Her father, C. Arthur Soucy, also served as a Manchester city alderman and as a city official in other capacities, and as a member of the federal Electoral College.

Soucy attended the Franklin Pierce Law Center (now the University of New Hampshire School of Law) and received a Juris Doctor degree.

Senate career
First elected in 2012, Soucy became the minority leader in August 2018, after the incumbent Jeff Woodburn stepped down from his leadership post because he had been arrested on domestic violence charges. Soucy was re-elected to her Senate seat that November, but Woodburn was not, as Democrats won the majority of Senate seats statewide. The 14 Democratic senators-elect chose Soucy as their leader at a caucus shortly after the 2018 mid-term election; she was later unanimously elected Senate President on December 5, 2018.

References

External links

Senator Donna Soucy government website
Donna Soucy for Senate campaign website

|-

|-

1967 births
2020 United States presidential electors
21st-century American politicians
21st-century American women politicians
Living people
Democratic Party members of the New Hampshire House of Representatives
Democratic Party New Hampshire state senators
Politicians from Manchester, New Hampshire
Saint Anselm College alumni
University of New Hampshire School of Law alumni
Women state legislators in New Hampshire